Megachile lefroma is a species of bee in the family Megachilidae. It was described by Cameron in 1907.

References

Lefroma
Insects described in 1907